Louvigny is a commune in the Moselle department in Grand Est in north-eastern France. It had a registered population of 890 in 2018.

Louvigny is the location of the Lorraine TGV station, which was opened in 2007, and is also close to the regional airport serving Metz and Nancy. The longer-term future of the Lorraine TGV station is the subject of a larger dispute between different tiers of local government. Another TGV station was proposed at Vandières, 10 km to the west, across the Moselle, at the connection point where the TGV line crosses the main line between Metz and Nancy. This project was abandoned in February 2015, following a regional referendum.

See also
 Communes of the Moselle department

References

External links
 

Communes of Moselle (department)